Speed skating at the 1994 Winter Olympics, was held from 13 to 25 February. Ten events were contested at Hamar Olympic Hall.

Medal summary

Medal table

Norway led the medal table in speed skating on home ice, led by Johann Olav Koss, who won three gold medals. Bonnie Blair was the most successful woman, with a pair of gold medals. Germany won the most total medals, with six, though only a single gold.

Russia and Belarus, competing for the first time in the Winter Games as independent nations, won their first speed skating medals. The countries were previously part of the Soviet Union, which had taken 60 speed skating medals over 9 Olympics.

Men's events

Women's events

Records

Four world records and five Olympic records were set in Lillehammer.

Participating NOCs

Twenty-one nations competed in the speed skating events at Lillehammer. Belarus, Kazakhstan, Russia and Ukraine made their Olympic speed skating debuts.

References

 
1994 Winter Olympics events
1994
1994 in speed skating
Olympics, 1994